Human adenovirus 36 (HAdV-36) or Ad-36 or Adv36 is one of 52 types of adenoviruses known to infect humans. AD-36, first isolated in 1978 from the feces of a girl suffering from diabetes and enteritis, has long been recognized as a cause of respiratory and eye infections in humans.
It was first shown to be associated with obesity in chickens by Dr. Nikhil Dhurandhar.

AD-36 infection can induce cellular differentiation of 3T3-L1 preadipocytes and stem cells derived  from human adipose tissue.

Role in obesity
There has been a positive correlation between body fat and the presence of AD-36 antibodies in the blood. Previous research showed that chickens or mice injected with similar types of viruses show a statistically significant weight gain.

To date, AD-36 is the only human adenovirus that has been linked with human obesity, present in 30% of obese humans and 11% of nonobese humans. In addition, a study of obese Americans indicates that about 30% of the obese individuals and only 5% of non-obese individuals have antibodies to Ad-36. Another study determined that children with the virus averaged 52 pounds heavier than those with no signs of it and obese children with the virus averaged 35 pounds heavier than obese children with no trace of the virus.  AD-36 also causes obesity in chickens, mice, rats, and monkeys.

Public awareness
On March 18, 2006, the research of Richard Atkinson (University of Wisconsin) was posted on some websites. In those studies, blood tests conducted on over 2000 Australians showed that more than 20% of the study participants had contracted Ad-36 viral infection.

On January 26, 2009, many popular internet news portals ran reports of the pending release of scientific research by Professor Nikhil Dhurandhar (Pennington Biomedical Research Center, Louisiana) implicating AD-36 as a potential cause for Britain's relatively high rate of adult obesity.

See also
 Fat virus

References

External links
 "The Fat Virus: Could Obesity Be Contagious?" at WebMD
 "Can a virus make you fat?" at BBC News
 "Fat Plague - Documentary" at 4oD
 "Contagious obesity? Identifying the human adenoviruses that may make us fat" at Science Blog
 "Common virus may contribute to obesity in some people, new study shows" at Biology News Net
 "Fat Virus, Ad-36 Blamed For Obesity Epidemic In Australians" at Medindia

Adenoviridae
Medical conditions related to obesity